The Hichiku dialect  is a group of the Japanese dialects spoken in western Kyushu. The name Hichiku (肥筑) is constructed by extracting a representative kanji from Hizen (肥前), Higo (肥後), Chikuzen (筑前) and Chikugo (筑後), the names of old provinces.

The Hichiku dialect includes:
 Chikuzen dialect (western Fukuoka Prefecture, formerly known as Chikuzen Province, includes the Hakata dialect of Hakata district in Fukuoka)
 Chikugo dialect (southern Fukuoka Prefecture, formerly known as Chikugo Province)
 Ōmuta dialect (Ōmuta)
 Yanagawa dialect (Yanagawa)
 Saga dialect (Saga Prefecture)
 Karatsu dialect (northern Saga Prefecture centered Karatsu)
 Tashiro dialect (easternmost Saga Prefecture centered Tashiro)
 Nagasaki dialect (Nagasaki Prefecture)
 Sasebo dialect (northern Nagasaki Prefecture centered Sasebo)
 Hirado dialect (Hirado Island, west of Nagasaki Prefecture)
 Kumamoto dialect (Kumamoto Prefecture)
 Hita dialect (Hita, southwestern Oita Prefecture)
 Iki dialect (Iki Island of Nagasaki Prefecture)
 Tsushima dialect (Tsushima Island of Nagasaki Prefecture)
 Gotō dialect (Gotō Islands of Nagasaki Prefecture)

References

Japanese dialects